Millions is a 1991 Italian drama film directed by Carlo Vanzina.

Cast
Carol Alt as Betta
Billy Zane as Maurizio Ferretti
Lauren Hutton as Cristina Ferretti
Jean Sorel as Leo Ferretti
Alexandra Paul as Giulia Ferretti
Roberto Bisacco as Osvaldo Ferretti
Catherine Hickland as Connie
John Stockwell as David Phipps
Florinda Bolkan as Margherita
Donald Pleasence as Ripa
Ben Hammer as Cristina's father
Michael Lombard as Tony Steiner
Cyrus Elias as Piero Costa
Mark Gellard as Alberto Ferretti
John Armstead as Lamberto Razza

References

External links

1991 films
Films directed by Carlo Vanzina
1990s Italian-language films
English-language Italian films
1991 drama films
Italian drama films
1990s Italian films